PSX may refer to: 
 Pakistan Stock Exchange, the stock exchange of Pakistan
 PSX (digital video recorder), a PlayStation-2-based digital video recorder
 PlayStation (console), commonly abbreviated as PS, PS1, PSOne or PSX
 PlayStation Experience, annual event for the video game industry, commonly abbreviated as "PSX" by the media
 The POSIX emulation subsystem on various DEC and IBM operating systems
 Adobe Photoshop Express, an online version of Adobe Photoshop
 Phillips 66, with PSX as its NYSE stock symbol